Otaq Sara may refer to:
 Otaq Sara, Babol